Sir Charles Feilding (c.1641 – 24 April 1722) was an Anglo-Irish politician. 

Feilding was the son of George Feilding, 1st Earl of Desmond and Bridget Stanhope.

He was made a Knight Bachelor in 1673 having gained the rank of Colonel in the 1st Regiment of Foot Guards. He was appointed a member of the Privy Council of Ireland by James II of England in 1685. He was the Member of Parliament for Limerick City in the Irish House of Commons from 1692 to 1693. He then represented Duleek between 1695 and 1699.

He married Ursula Stockton, daughter of Sir Thomas Stockton, in 1674, by whom he had two daughters.

References

Year of birth uncertain
1722 deaths
17th-century Anglo-Irish people
18th-century Anglo-Irish people
Irish MPs 1692–1693
Irish MPs 1695–1699
Knights Bachelor
Members of the Parliament of Ireland (pre-1801) for County Limerick constituencies
Members of the Parliament of Ireland (pre-1801) for County Meath constituencies
Members of the Privy Council of Ireland